Ben Marschke (born 19 June 1997) is an Australian professional rugby league footballer who plays as a  for the Sydney Roosters in the NRL.

Background
Marschke was born in Bundaberg, Queensland and played his junior rugby league for the Across The Waves Tigers and attended St Luke's Anglican School and Shalom College before being signed by the Sydney Roosters. Marschke is of Irish descent.

Playing career
In 2013, Marschke played for the Central Crows in the Cyril Connell Cup. In 2014, he moved up to their Mal Meninga Cup side. In 2015, Marschke moved to Sydney, playing for the Roosters in the SG Ball Cup. In 2016 and 2017, Marschke played for the Roosters' under-20s team.

In 2018, Marschke played for the Penrith Panthers in the NSW Cup. In 2019, he played for the Canterbury-Bankstown Bulldogs NSW Cup side. In 2020, he played for the Bulldogs at the NRL Nines in Perth.

2021
In 2021, Marschke joined North Sydney, the Roosters' NSW Cup feeder club.
In Round 4 of the 2021 NRL season, Marschke was called up to the Sydney Roosters first grade side, making his debut in their 32–12 win over the New Zealand Warriors.

2022
Marschke made no appearances for the Sydney Roosters in the 2022 NRL season. Marschke instead featured for the clubs NSW Cup team North Sydney playing 23 games throughout the year.

References

External links
Sydney Roosters profile

1997 births
Australian rugby league players
Australian people of Irish descent
Australian people of Croatian descent
Rugby league hookers
Sydney Roosters players
North Sydney Bears NSW Cup players
Newtown Jets NSW Cup players
Living people
Rugby league players from Bundaberg